Serine/threonine kinase 11 interacting protein is a protein that in humans is encoded by the STK11IP gene.

References

Further reading